The Keller Independent School District is a pre-kindergarten to grade 12 public school district based in Keller, Texas, United States. Located in Tarrant County, serves more than 34,000 students and operated 42 schools in the 2020–2021 school year.

Demographics
This was a fast-growing area, with about 2,800 new homes being built in the district every year, and enrollment is rising more than 2,000 students annually as of 2006.

History

Book challenges

The school district has received national attention for examining over forty books from library media centers and classrooms, including The Diary of Anne Frank, The Bluest Eye, and several versions of the Bible.

The company Patriot Mobile was key in influencing school board races so it could get school board members friendly to radical right wing extremist interests.

Schools
Schools are listed with the cities they are located in, predominantly, most schools are located in northeast Fort Worth, Texas, while some are within Keller, Texas city limits.

High schools (grades 9–12)
 Central High School, Fort Worth (est. 2003)
 Fossil Ridge High School, Fort Worth (established 1994) (dedicated in 1995) (expansion in 1997 to 2001)
 Keller High School, Keller
1999-2000 National Blue Ribbon School
 Timber Creek High School, Fort Worth (est. 2009)
 Keller Compass Center, Keller
 Keller Center for Advanced Learning (est. 2016)
 Keller Collegiate Academy

Middle Schools (5–8)
 Indian Springs Middle School, Keller
 Timberview Middle School, Fort Worth (est. 2010)
 Vista Ridge Middle School, Fort Worth (est. 2017)

Middle schools (7–8)
 Fossil Hill Middle School, Fort Worth (est. 1987) (exp. 2001)
 Hillwood Middle School, Fort Worth
 Keller Middle School, Keller
 Trinity Springs Middle School, Fort Worth

Intermediate schools (5–6)
 Bear Creek Intermediate School, Keller
 Chisholm Trail Intermediate School, Fort Worth (est. 1990) (exp. 2013)
 Parkwood Hill Intermediate School, Fort Worth (est. 2004)
 Trinity Meadows Intermediate School, Fort Worth (est. 2006)

Elementary Schools

See also
List of school districts in Texas

References

External links
 Keller Independent School District

School districts in Tarrant County, Texas
North Richland Hills, Texas
School districts in Fort Worth, Texas
1911 establishments in Texas
School districts established in 1911